This is a list of past cast members on the CBS Daytime soap opera, The Young and the Restless.

Previous cast members

Notable celebrity appearances

In the past, numerous notable celebrities have had appearances on the show either as them self or a character.

Composer Andrew Lloyd Webber appeared in 1993 to personally invite Danny Romalotti to play the lead in a revival production of Webber's Joseph and the Amazing Technicolor Dreamcoat. This set up actor Michael Damian's hiatus from The Young and the Restless to play the title role in a Los Angeles production of Joseph.
British boy band A1 appeared at the 2002 Walnut Grove Academy prom.
Chris Botti played at Michael and Lauren's wedding 2005.
Wayne Brady and his 'real life' mother visited with Paul and Mary Williams on Mother's Day 2003.
Joel Brooks appeared as Judge Ramsey from 2014-2015.
Peter Cincotti appeared in 2003 to surprise Christine.
Robert Clary (of Hogan's Heroes fame) was part of the series original regular cast members when the show premiered.
Colby Donaldson (of Survivor: The Australian Outback) flirted in 2004 with Brittany before noticing her scar at the opening of the Rec Center.
Josh Gracin, former American Idol contestant, appeared as a cowboy named Jack in June 2006.
Wayne Gretzky appeared as Wayne on November 12, 1981.
Enrique Iglesias appeared as himself in November 2007.
Il Divo appeared in 2005 to surprise Nikki.
Jewel appeared on May 31, 2006, to sing at a benefit in memory of Cassie Newman.
Brian Jordan of the Atlanta Braves appeared as himself on the show on 2 or 3 different occasions.
George Kennedy appeared as Victor's father in 2003, and again in a "Christmas Carol" themed episode in 2010.
B. B. King appeared in 2001.
Darlene Koldenhoven appeared and sang while Nikki walked down the aisle in 2002.
Kenny Lattimore and Chanté Moore appeared in December 2003 as special guests at Neil and Dru's wedding.
Reichen Lehmkuhl of The Amazing Race has played Katherine Chancellor's bartender.
Tara Lipinski, Olympic Gold medalist, playing Megan Dennison's friend Marnie Kowalski in 1999.
Rich Little; appeared in the 1980s when Brad's ex-wife, Lisa, had him mimic Brad's voice on a tape.
Michael McDonald; appeared in the 1980s, performing "Sweet Freedom" during Danny Romalotti's concert.
Jerri Manthey of Survivor: The Australian Outback discussed a Jabot promotional contract with Jill.
Lionel Richie appeared in 2001 at a club visited by Sean Bridges and Jill.
Smokey Robinson appeared in 2004 to give J.T. advice about the music business.
Jesse Ventura appeared as himself in 2001.
Luke Walton appeared as himself in 2006, played a pick-up game of basketball with Neil Winters.
Lee Philip Bell appeared as herself on the September 11, 2006 episode.
Will Kirby of Big Brother appeared on the October 23, 2006 episode, talking to Jack at Jabot.
Aaron Neville appeared as himself, singing at the opening of Neil and Dru's jazz club "Indigo" on October 27, 2006.
Sylvia Browne appeared as herself for several episodes.
J. J. Hardy, Bill Hall and Jeff Suppan of the Milwaukee Brewers Baseball Club appeared on June 20, 2007.
Pat Benatar and Neil Giraldo appeared as themselves on February 14 and 15, 2008 at Indigo.
Trace Adkins appeared as himself, singing at the Restless Style office for Phyllis' and Nick's anniversary on May 2, 2008.
Kathy Hilton appeared as herself at the Restless Style office on May 13, 2008.
Katy Perry appeared as herself for the cover of Restless Style Magazine on Thursday, June 12, 2008.
Green River Ordinance appeared as themselves on July 8, 2011.
 Actor James Avery appeared as Judge Roy Daley from October 11 to October 15, 2012.
 Tom Selleck appeared as Jed Andrews in 1974 and 1975.
 Nichelle Nichols appeared as Neil Winter’s mother Lucinda for two appearances in 2016.
Aileen Quinn appeared as a caroler at Chancellor Park in December 23, 2016.
Wayne Knight appeared as music promoter Irv West on September 20 and 21, 2017.
Diana DeGarmo
Bronson Pinchot
Sean Young
Colby Donaldson
Jerri Manthey
George Takei presided over Neil and Drucilla's wedding.
Corbin Bernsen
Wayne Brady
Dorian Harewood
Josh Gracin
Van Cliburn
Dr. Will
Will Kirby
Trace Adkins
Little Richard
David Hasselhoff
Sheryl Underwood
Mike Richards
Dayanara Torres appeared as Elise Tomkins in 2005.
Michael Gross
Catherine Bach
Bonnie Franklin

See also
 List of The Young and the Restless cast members

References

Young and the Restless
Cast members

fr:Liste des acteurs des Feux de l'amour